The discography of Ole Børud, a singer, songwriter, and multi-instrumentalist from Hamar, Norway, consists of eight studio albums, including one collaborative album, five compilation albums, three of which were collaborative, a collaborative EP, sixteen singles, including four collaborative singles and five as a featured artist, five guest appearances, nine contributions to compilation albums, a live video album as a featured performer, one collaborative music video, and one music video as a featured performer. The son of gospel singer Arnold Børud, Ole began a career in music at age five as a member of the family musical group Arnold B. Family, a group which would participate in the Melodi Grand Prix three times. In 1988 at age twelve, Børud released a studio album of Christian children's music, Alle Skal Få Vite Det! In the mid- and late-1990s, Børud forayed into heavy metal music: He co-founded the death-doom project Schaliach in 1995 before joining the progressive death metal band Extol in 1996. He has also performed for or collaborated with Torun Eriksen, Sofian, Larvik Stroband, and the Oslo Gospel Choir.

In 2002, he released a studio album as a solo artist, Chi Rho, in which he performed covers of hit songs by various Christian contemporary musicians. In 2008, Børud released Shakin' the Ground, a studio album in which he established a West Coast style that he has continued on subsequent album. Børud considers Shakin' the Ground his true debut as a solo performer as his previous release was entirely of unoriginal music. The same year, he collaborated with Kåre Conradi and Ingelin Reigstad Norheim along with girls from the Jeløy Church's Children's and Youth Choirs to release Takk, gode Gud, for alle ting: 20 sanger fra Barnesalmeboka, a compilation album of 20 hymns. Also in 2008, he collaborated with Ann Kristin Wenneberg, Marianne Bondevik, Hans Esben Gihle, and Voxkids to create another hymn compilation, Søndagsskolen Synger, and contributed to the compilation Perfekt Sommer. In 2009, he was featured along with Samuel Ljungblahd and Miriam Gardner on the Joakim Arenius and Praise Unit three-track single "The Mission Field", from the album of the same name. In 2011, he released Keep Movin, which peaked at no. 27 on the Norwegian charts and no. 15 on the Swedish charts. A single was released for that album in 2011 as well, "She's Like No Other". That same year, he performed live with Santa Fe and the Fat City Horns, a concert which was later released on DVD in 2013. In 2012, Børud was featured on the song "Get Ready" by INC the Choir on the album Higher. He also appeared in 2013 on the Lars-Erik Dahle album Step into the Water for the song "Barrytown", and with his father, Arnold, on the Rune Larson song "All Shook Up" from the album Tidens Gate. Later that year collaborated with Samuel Ljungblahd for a stand-alone Christmas single, "Mary's Boy Child", released on November 8, and on December 23 the pair released a full Christmas album, Someday At Christmas. The album charted at no. 39 in Norway and no. 13 in Sweden. That year Børud also released a best-of compilation, The Best.

His next studio release was Stepping Up, released on November 24, 2014, which was accompanied by the single "Maybe". On March 8, 2017, Lars-Erik Dahle, featuring Børud, released a remixed version of "Barrytown" — "Barrytown [Waveform Five Mix]" — as a single. Also that year, Ljungblahd and Børud collaborated once again for the Christmas single "O Holy Night", released on November 10. On January 18, 2019, Trine Rein featured Børud on her single "Where Do We Go". His seventh studio album, Outside the Limit, was released on September 20, 2019. Three singles have been released for Outside the Limit: "Good Time", released on November 16, 2018, "Fast Enough", released on February 1, 2019, and "Outside the Limit", released August 28, 2019. Børud also was featured as a vocalist and guitarist on the progressive death metal band Cognizance's single "Malignant Domain", released August 22, 2019. On November 22, 2019, he appeared, in collaboration with Lewi Bergrud and Maria Solheim, on the Christmas EP Blåtoner. The next year the same trio recorded a music video performing the hymn "En krybbe var vuggen" ("Away in a Manger") and a single, "Julefred", the latter featuring Frøydis Grorud. On April 13, 2020, Børud was featured along with Kine L. Fossheim on the single and music video "Together We Stand". The song was released by Gospel Explosion, a choral project led by Leif Ingvald Skaug. As a result of the COVID-19 pandemic, Leif began holding online choir rehearsals, in which individuals from 70 different countries participated. Many of these choral members then collaborated from around the world to create the song. His eighth studio album, Soul Letters, was released on February 11, 2022, and was preceded by three singles — "Just for a Little While", "At My Best", and "Love Remedy".

Studio albums 
"—" denotes a recording that did not chart.

Extended plays

Compilation albums

Singles

As primary artist

As a featured artist

Additional appearances

Live albums

Guest appearances

Music videos

As featured performer

References 

Discographies of Norwegian artists
Christian music discographies
Rock music discographies
Pop music discographies
Jazz discographies
Soul music discographies
Heavy metal discographies